Greg Scales is a former professional American football player, who played tight end for four seasons with the New Orleans Saints.

References

1966 births
American football tight ends
New Orleans Saints players
Wake Forest Demon Deacons football players
Living people